Khuwaiter Al-Dhaheri (born 2 March 1979) is an Emirati swimmer. He competed in the 1996 Summer Olympics.

References

1979 births
Living people
Swimmers at the 1996 Summer Olympics
Emirati male swimmers
Olympic swimmers of the United Arab Emirates
Swimmers at the 1998 Asian Games
Asian Games competitors for the United Arab Emirates